Yarmouth 33 is a Mi'kmaq reserve located in Yarmouth County, Nova Scotia. The population was 157 in 2011.

It is administratively part of the Acadia First Nation.

Indian reserves in Nova Scotia
Communities in Yarmouth County
Mi'kmaq in Canada